The Pointing Finger is a 1933 British drama film directed by George Pearson and starring John Stuart, Viola Keats and Leslie Perrins. The screenplay concerns a man who plots to murder his half-brother so he can claim his earldom and an inheritance. The film was made by Twickenham Film Studios with sets designed by the art director James A. Carter. It was distributed by RKO Pictures as a quota quickie. Based on the novel The Pointing Finger (1907) by "Rita," it was a remake of the 1922 film of the same name.

Cast
 John Stuart as Lord Rollestone 
 Viola Keats as Lady Mary Stuart 
 Leslie Perrins as Honorable James Mallory 
 Michael Hogan as Patrick Lafone 
 A. Bromley Davenport as Lord Edensore 
 Henrietta Watson as Lady Anne Rollestone 
 D.J. Williams as Grimes 
 Clare Greet as Landlady

References

Bibliography
 Chibnall, Steve. Quota Quickies: The Birth of the British 'B' Film. British Film Institute, 2007.
 Low, Rachael. Filmmaking in 1930s Britain. George Allen & Unwin, 1985.
 Wood, Linda. British Films, 1927-1939. British Film Institute, 1986.

External links

1933 films
1933 drama films
1930s English-language films
Films directed by George Pearson
British drama films
British black-and-white films
Remakes of British films
Sound film remakes of silent films
1930s British films
Films shot at Twickenham Film Studios
RKO Pictures films
Films based on British novels
Quota quickies